Heifer may refer to:

 Heifer (cow), a young cow before she has had her first calf
 Frank Heifer (1854–1893), American outfielder and first baseman
 The Heifer (La vaquilla), 1985 Spanish comedy film
 Heifer International, a charitable organization
 Red heifer, in Christianity or Judaism, was a heifer that was sacrificed and whose ashes were used for the ritual purification

See also 
 Heffer (disambiguation)